Sir Percy Vincent, 1st Baronet (1868 – 22 January 1943) was Lord Mayor of London for 1935 to 1936. Previously, he was Sheriff of the City of London for 1926 to 1927. 
He was Alderman between 1929 and 1942.

See also 
Vincent baronets

References 
https://www.ukwhoswho.com/view/10.1093/ww/9780199540891.001.0001/ww-9780199540884-e-232972

Knights Bachelor
20th-century lord mayors of London
Sheriffs of the City of London
Aldermen of the City of London
Baronets in the Baronetage of the United Kingdom
English justices of the peace
1868 births
1943 deaths